Trofa is a municipality in the north of the Porto metropolitan area in Portugal, 18 km from central Porto. The population in 2011 was 38,999, in an area of 72.02 km².

Trofa has a strong industrial park, with various types of industry including pharmaceutical, metalworking and textile industries.

The city centre is formed by the parish Bougado (São Martinho e Santiago). Another important center in the municipality is Coronado.

Parishes
Although in the beginning of the municipality, it had 8 parishes, with the administrative changes in 2013, is divided into 5 civil parishes (freguesias):
 Alvarelhos e Guidões
 Bougado (São Martinho e Santiago)
 Coronado (São Romão e São Mamede)
 Covelas
 Muro

History 

Trofa has had an important role due to its geographic location between Porto and Braga, being located in the border of Douro and Minho, but still inside of the district of Porto, which led to Trofa being mentioned in the time of the Roman Empire ("trofa" means frontier in Arab). An important factor of its growth was the construction of railways in the beginning of the 20th century, which led to rapid growth.

Notable people 
 Tiago Pereira (born 1975), known as Tiago, a former footballer with 631 club caps

References

External links

Forum Trofa
Municipio da Trofa / City Site

 
Municipalities of Porto District